USS Alcedo (SP-166) was a yacht in the United States Navy. She was the first American vessel lost in World War I.

Alcedo was built in 1895 at Glasgow, Scotland, by D. and W. Henderson and Company. She was purchased by the Navy on 1 June 1917 from Mr. George W. C. Drexel of Philadelphia, Pennsylvania, and commissioned at New York City on 28 July 1917.

Service history
Assigned to the Patrol Force, Alcedo departed Newport, Rhode Island on 5 August 1917. Steaming via Newfoundland and the Azores, the yacht arrived at Brest, France on the 30th. During her brief Navy career, the yacht conducted anti-submarine patrols and convoy-escort missions along the French coast. On two occasions, she rescued crew members of torpedoed merchantmen. On 17 October, the little warship picked up 118 men from the troop transport steamer , which had been sunk by a submerged German U-boat. Twelve days later, she saved another 85 survivors from SS Finland.

Almost instantaneously with the sounding of the alarm, the German submarine UC-71 fired a single torpedo in a surface attack. (Some Alcedo records suggest that the U-boat submerged first, but the official German account confirms a surface attack.) Alcedo attempted to change course to evade the torpedo, but she answered her helm sluggishly. The torpedo struck the yacht on the port side well forward, and Alcedo began to settle fast. Soon after the hit, the ship's commanding officer ordered her abandoned, and she went down in eight minutes. The yacht lost one officer, Lieutenant, junior grade John Melvin, and 20 sailors in the action to both wounds and drowning. The remainder of her crew took to the boats in two separate groups. After a long time rowing, one group — which included the commanding officer — was picked up by a French torpedo boat. The other was towed to safety by French fishermen.

Alcedos name was struck from the Naval Vessel Register on 17 December 1917.

References

External links

 

 

Patrol vessels of the United States Navy
World War I patrol vessels of the United States
Steam yachts
Ships built on the River Clyde
1895 ships
Ships sunk by German submarines in World War I
World War I shipwrecks in the Atlantic Ocean
Maritime incidents in 1917